The Woodbine Mile is a Grade I stakes race on turf for Thoroughbred racehorses three years old and up held annually in mid September at Woodbine Racetrack in Toronto, Canada. Currently sponsored by Ricoh, the Woodbine Mile offers a purse of Can$1,000,000.

Part of the Breeders' Cup Challenge series, the winner of the Woodbine Mile automatically qualifies for the Breeders' Cup Mile.

The inaugural race in 1988 was sponsored by Molson Breweries with a purse of $750,000 and run as the Molson Export Challenge, reflecting the name of the company's flagship beer. It was changed to the Molson Export Million when the purse was increased to $1 million. In 1999, under new sponsorship it was renamed and raced as the Atto Mile until 2006.

Since inception, the race has been run at three different distances:
 1 mile on turf: 1997–present
  miles on dirt: 1991–1996
  miles on dirt: 1988–1990

Originally restricted to three-year-olds on the dirt, with the modification to one mile on turf in 1997 the race was also made open to older horses. As a result of the change from dirt to turf, the race was ungraded in 1997 and 1998.

Historical notes

In 2005, the Brazilian horse, Leroidesanimaux, set the record for the largest margin of victory at seven and three-quarter lengths while carrying the highest weight of any winner in the race's history at 124 pounds.

In 2009, Ventura became the first female to win this race in 13 years. In the process, she also set the record time of 1:32.04. Wise Dan broke this record in 2013 while becoming the first two-time winner of the race.

Records

Time record: 
 1:31.75 – Wise Dan (2013) (at current distance) (this is also the track record)

Most wins
 2 – Wise Dan (2012, 2013)

Most wins by an owner:
 3 – Sam-Son Farm (1991, 1999, 2004)

Most wins by a jockey:
 5 – John R. Velazquez (2000, 2005, 2012, 2013, 2017)

Most wins by a trainer:
 4 – Neil D. Drysdale (1989, 1998, 2003, 2006)
 3 – Robert J. Frankel (2000, 2005, 2009) 
 3 – Charles Lopresti (2011, 2012, 2013)

Winners

† – Hawksley Hill won the 1999 race but was disqualified to 4th

See also
 List of Canadian flat horse races

References

 The 2009 Woodbine Mile at the NTRA 
 Woodbine Mile History at Woodbine Entertainment

Open mile category horse races
Turf races in Canada
Grade 1 stakes races in Canada
Breeders' Cup Challenge series
Woodbine Racetrack
Sport in Toronto
Recurring sporting events established in 1988
Molson Coors Beverage Company
1988 establishments in Ontario